KZMN (103.9 FM, "The Monster 103.9") is a radio station licensed to serve Kalispell, Montana.  The station is owned by KOFI, Inc. It airs a Classic rock music format.

Their studios are downtown Kalispell at 317 1st Ave. E. with sister station KOFI. The transmitter and 570 foot tower are in Somers, on Buffalo Trail Road.

The station was assigned the KZMN call letters by the Federal Communications Commission on May 15, 2003.

References

External links
KZMN official website

ZMN
Flathead County, Montana
Classic rock radio stations in the United States